Rupestrella is a genus of gastropods belonging to the family Chondrinidae.

The species of this genus are found in Mediterranean.

Species:

Rupestrella dupotetii 
Rupestrella homala 
Rupestrella occulta 
Rupestrella philippii 
Rupestrella rhodia 
Rupestrella rupestris

References

Chondrinidae